Four Crosses is a hamlet located west of Llanfair Caereinion in Powys, Wales. It is situated off the A458 between Llanfair Caereinion and Mallwyd. The hamlet is included in the community of Llanfair Caerinion and only consists of a few farmhouses and a country park called "Wanderes Sanctuary Noddfa Crwydro" as well as a campsite and fishing lake.

Amenities
The hamlet only has two amenities which are a campsite and a fishing lake. The nearby village of Llanerfyl has amenities including a service station, church, furniture shop, workshops and school. The nearest retail centers are in Llanfair Caereinion, Welshpool and Machynlleth. There is also a regular bus service in nearby Llanderfyl which is served by the 87 bus service between Welshpool and Foel via Llanfair Caereinion.

Tourism
The hamlet is located near both Dyfnant Forest and Lake Vyrnwy. The nearby Welshpool and Llanfair Light Railway offers heritage railway services to both Llanfair Caereinion and Welshpool. The hamlet is also near the Welsh Hills.

References

Villages in Powys
Llanfair Caereinion